North Carolina's 3rd House district is one of 120 districts in the North Carolina House of Representatives. It has been represented by Republican Steve Tyson since 2021.

Geography
Since 2019, the district has included part of Craven County. The district overlaps with the 2nd Senate district.

District officeholders since 1993

Election results

2022

2020

2018

2016

2014

2012

2010

2008

2006

2004

2002

2000

References

North Carolina House districts
Craven County, North Carolina